Deltocephalus is a leafhopper genus in the sub family Deltocephalinae.

Deltocephalus vulgaris is a vector of the sugarcane grassy shoot disease.

References

External links 
 Deltocephalus at bugguide.net

Cicadellidae genera
Deltocephalini